Eunidia piperita is a species of beetle in the family Cerambycidae. It was described by Charles Joseph Gahan in 1898.

References

Eunidiini
Beetles described in 1898
Taxa named by Charles Joseph Gahan